Canarium fuscocalycinum is a tree of Borneo in the incense tree family Burseraceae. The specific epithet  is from the Latin meaning "dark calyx".

Description
Its twigs are rusty brown.

Distribution and habitat
Canarium fuscocalycinum is endemic to Borneo where it is confined to Sarawak. Its habitat is lowland mixed dipterocarp forests.

References

fuscocalycinum
Trees of Borneo
Endemic flora of Borneo
Flora of Sarawak
Plants described in 1930
Taxonomy articles created by Polbot
Taxobox binomials not recognized by IUCN